Excelsior is a small farming town in the Free State province of South Africa. It was formed by farmers in 1910 who wanted a town which was closer to them than Winburg and Ladybrand.

The farmers had to decide on which farm the town will be established. The two farms were Sunshine and Excelsior (Latin), which, translated to English means "Higher Up", or in Afrikaans "Hoër Op". The farm Excelsior was chosen due to its higher location. The first church was erected in the vicinity of where the Farmers Co-op is situated today. Excelsior was a newsworthy town in the late 1960s and early 1970s for 19 people contravening the Immorality Act under Apartheid Legislation (Also known as the Excelsior 19). A better understanding on what happened between white males and black females can be read in the book The Madonna of Excelsior by South African-born author, Zakes Mda.

The secondary asphalt roads were built in 1980 to 1984, and this helped not travelling on the gravel roads to Bloemfontein via Verkeerdevlei. Many accidents and deaths on the roads close to town occurred before the roads were upgraded.

Water to the town is supplied via boreholes, filled with good levels of fluoride and stored in sandstone reservoirs up at the "neck" on the road to Winburg. Today, a weather station is based in this small town, and very accurate readings help farmers plan for agricultural purposes.

References

 

Populated places in the Mantsopa Local Municipality
Populated places established in 1910